Ava Muhammad (1951 – 25 August 2022) was an American Black Muslim. In 1998 she became the first female Minister to preside over a mosque and region in the history of the Nation of Islam (NOI). Her job as national spokesperson for Minister Farrakhan is among the most prominent in the nation — a post formerly held by Malcolm X under Nation of Islam patriarch Elijah Muhammad. Minister Ava Muhammad is also a member of the Muslim Girls Training (MGT).

In addition to administering day-to-day affairs at the mosque Muhammad was named Southern Regional Minister, giving her jurisdiction over Nation of Islam mosque activity in Georgia, Alabama, Mississippi, and parts of Tennessee.

Biography 
In 1975 she received her Juris Doctor from Georgetown University Law Center. She later became a member of the New York Bar Association.
She married Darius Muhammad in 1988; she was a lawyer, minister, and also the National Spokesperson for the Minister Louis Farrakhan and the Nation of Islam.

She was a researcher and author of several books and hosted a weekly radio talk show titled "Elevated Places" which airs every Sunday on WVON 1690AM in Chicago.
Dr. Muhammad was also a cancer survivor. She had talked about overcoming it in the past, but recently, she spoke about her life-changing journey in extraordinary detail in recognition of Cancer Survivors Month in the United States.

References

External links
 

Nation of Islam religious leaders
Living people
1951 births
American lawyers
American women lawyers
21st-century African-American people
21st-century African-American women
20th-century African-American people
20th-century African-American women
Antisemitism_in_the_United_States
Black_supremacists
American_conspiracy_theorists
Female Islamic religious leaders